The 26th Scripps National Spelling Bee was held in Washington, District of Columbia on May 21, 1953, sponsored by the E.W. Scripps Company.

The winner was 13-year-old Elizabeth Hess of Arizona, correctly spelling the word soubrette. 11-year-old Raymond A. Sokolov of Detroit, Michigan placed second, falling on "spermaceti", after finishing 22nd the prior year. Third place went to 13-year-old David Hudson of Cuyahoga Falls, Ohio, who had placed sixth the prior year.

There were 53 contestants this year, 37 girls and 16 boys. Four were returning spellers, and the youngest speller this year was 11. 541 words were used. The contest started at 8:45 am and continued until 5:40pm except for a lunch break and brief recesses.

As of 2018, Hess is the only speller from Arizona to have ever won the Bee.

References

Scripps National Spelling Bee competitions
1953 awards
1953 in Washington (state)
May 1953 events in the United States